Presidential elections were held in Cyprus on 28 January 2018. As no candidate received a majority of the vote in the first round, a run-off was held on 4 February between the top two candidates, incumbent President Nicos Anastasiades of the Democratic Rally (DISY) and Stavros Malas of the Progressive Party of Working People. Anastasiades emerged as the winner with 55.99% of the vote.

Electoral system
The President of Cyprus is elected using the two-round system; if no candidate gets a majority in the first round of voting, a run-off is held between the top two candidates.

Candidates

Nicos Anastasiades, DISY
Charis Aristeidou, Independent
Christos Christou, ELAM (Cyprus)
Andreas Efstratiou, Independent
Christakis Kapiliotis, Independent
Giorgos Lillikas, Citizens' Alliance
Stavros Malas, Progressive Party of Working People
Michail Mina, Organisation of Justice Fighters
Nikolas Papadopoulos, Democratic Party also endorsed by the Solidarity Movement and the Movement for Social Democracy

Opinion polls

First round

Results

By district

First round

Second round

Notes

References

Presidential elections in Cyprus
Cyprus
Presidential
2010s in Cypriot politics
Cyprus
Cyprus